The Saliente River is a river in Jayuya, Puerto Rico.
 is a large boulder in the river with petroglyphs from Taino.

See also
La Piedra Escrita: Rock art site in the river
List of rivers of Puerto Rico

References

External links
 USGS Hydrologic Unit Map – Caribbean Region (1974)
Rios de Puerto Rico

Rivers of Puerto Rico